A walnut is the nut of any tree of the genus Juglans.

Walnut may also refer to:

Trees and fruit
Juglans regia, the Persian, English, or common walnut, a tree which produces most of the walnuts sold as food
Juglans,  the genus of trees that produce walnuts
Endiandra, a genus of trees from south east Asia, Australia and the Pacific
Coula edulis, African walnut, a tree in the family Olacaceae

Film
Walnuts, a 2002 South African direct-to-DVD animated film from Disney

Timber
see Juglans#Wood

Places

United States
Walnut, California, a city
Walnut, Georgia, a ghost town
Walnut, Illinois, a village
Walnut, Indiana, an unincorporated community
Walnut, Iowa, a city
Walnut, Kansas, a city
Walnut, Mississippi, a town
Walnut, Missouri, an unincorporated community
Walnut, Nebraska, an unincorporated community
Walnut, North Carolina, an unincorporated community
Walnut, Ohio, an unincorporated community
Walnut Canyon National Monument, Arizona
Walnut–Locust (SEPTA station), a subway station in Philadelphia
Walnut River (Kansas) and Little Walnut River, rivers in Kansas
Walnut Springs, Texas, a city

United Kingdom
Walnut Tree, Milton Keynes, England

Other uses
Paulie Walnuts, a fictional character from the HBO series The Sopranos
Walnut elimia, a North American gastropod
Walnut sauce (also known as walnut paste), a food paste in Persian and Georgian cuisine
Walnut Whales, a 2002 folk music EP by Joanna Newsom
Walnut Whip, British confection

See also
Walnut Bend (disambiguation)
Walnut Creek (disambiguation)
Walnut Grove (disambiguation)
Walnut Hill (disambiguation)
Walnut Lake (disambiguation)
Walnut Park (disambiguation)
Walnut Street (disambiguation)
Walnut Township (disambiguation)
Walnut Tree (disambiguation)